The name Isaac (or the variant Isaack) has been used for five tropical cyclones in the Atlantic Ocean and for one in the South Pacific Ocean, and has been used for one extratropical european windstorm.

In the Atlantic:
 Tropical Storm Isaac (1988) – short-lived storm, never threatened land
 Hurricane Isaac (2000) – reached Category 4 strength, stayed mostly in the open sea, but caused waves that capsized a boat near Long Island, drowning one person
 Hurricane Isaac (2006) – Category 1, passed well east of Bermuda, became extratropical near Newfoundland
 Hurricane Isaac (2012) – destructive Category 1 hurricane, that hit Louisiana causing over $3 billion in damages.
Hurricane Isaac (2018) – minimal hurricane that passed through the Lesser Antilles and dissipated in the eastern Caribbean Sea

In the South Pacific:
 Cyclone Isaac (1982) – struck Tonga

In Europe:
 Storm Isaack (2023) – impacted southwestern Europe

Atlantic hurricane set index articles
Australian region cyclone set index articles